Carol Bressanutti (born 14 April 1993) is an Italian former competitive figure skater. She has won seven senior international medals. At the 2012 World Junior Championships, she qualified for the free skate and finished 18th.

Programs

Competitive highlights 
CS: Challenger Series; JGP: Junior Grand Prix

References

External links 

 
 Carol Bressanutti at Tracings

1993 births
Italian female single skaters
Living people
Sportspeople from Bolzano
Competitors at the 2015 Winter Universiade
20th-century Italian women
21st-century Italian women